"Teen Age Riot" is a song  by American rock band Sonic Youth, and the first single from their 1988 album, Daydream Nation. It received heavy airplay on modern rock stations and considerably expanded their audience (along with the album itself).

"Teen Age Riot" is one of Sonic Youth's most recognizable songs, yet it is something of an oddity amongst their repertoire, consisting of a traditional verse-chorus pop song structure. The song was included in The Rock and Roll Hall of Fame's 500 Songs that Shaped Rock and Roll and is an on-disc track in Rock Band 2.

"Teen Age Riot" was the final song performed live by the band, serving as the closer for their last show at the SWU Festival in São Paulo, Brazil on 14 November 2011.

Music and lyrics
The song is about an alternate reality where J Mascis is president of the United States. In the liner notes accompanying the deluxe edition of Daydream Nation, Byron Coley quoted Thurston Moore on "Teen Age Riot": "It was actually about appointing J Mascis as our de facto alternative dream president".

The album version of the song has two distinct parts. The intro section features a repeating, hypnotic guitar melody, and Kim Gordon reciting in a stream-of-consciousness manner such utterances as "You're it, no you're it / Say it, don't spray it / Miss me, don't dismiss me / Spirit desire / We will fall." ("We Will Fall" is a reference to the Stooges' song of the same name from their debut eponymous album). After 80 seconds, all instruments stop, and Moore breaks through the fading instruments with a fast, distorted, noisy guitar riff, opening the main section of the song. The riff leads to the dynamic guitar melody that plays throughout the rest of the song with the vocal melody, sung by Moore. The riff that opens the section is repeated once again afterwards in the song, with all of the instruments accompanying it in an interlude that leads to the song's last few lines.

As with many Sonic Youth songs, the guitars were unconventionally tuned; in this case, Moore's pentatonic tuning was (reading from left to right, the lowest-pitched string to the highest-pitched string) GABDEG and Lee Ranaldo's tuning was GGDDGG, as published in a Guitar World interview with the band.

Some live performances of "Teen Age Riot" omitted the opening section sung by Gordon, notably the live version recorded and released with the deluxe edition of Daydream Nation. The opening section was also cut from the song's music video.

Critical reception
Mark Deming of AllMusic described "Teen Age Riot" as a "trippy joy", further praising the song as a "glorious experience". According to Greg Kot of the Chicago Tribune, the song is one of "the band's best, straight-ahead tunes". Michael Hand of The Guardian designated the song as a highlight from Daydream Nation, further describing the song as a "wistful opener". Nitsuh Abebe of Pitchfork praised the song, commenting that it's "the most glorious, accessible pop song of [Sonic Youth's] career". Robert Palmer of Rolling Stone also spoke positively of "Teen Age Riot", describing the song as "driving slamtempo pop power".

In 2021, it was ranked at No. 157 on Rolling Stone's "Top 500 Best Songs of All Time".

Chart performance
In the United States, "Teen Age Riot" debuted at number 28 on the Alternative Airplay chart for the issue dated December 24, 1988. Over the next month, the song slowly rose on the chart before ultimately reaching a peak of number 20 for the issue dated February 4, 1989. "Teen Age Riot" spent a total of nine consecutive weeks on the chart.

Music video
The video for the song was Sonic Youth's fourth overall, excluding the low-budget Ciccone Youth videos; the band directed it themselves. It included clips of many icons of alternative music culture such as Mascis, Mark E. Smith, Johnny Thunders, Neil Young, Patti Smith, Iggy Pop, Sun Ra, D. Boon, Mike Watt, Ian MacKaye, Henry Rollins, Nick Cave, Tom Waits, Blixa Bargeld and Kiss.

Track listings and formats
UK and US 12-inch single 
"Teen Age Riot" (Gordon, Moore, Ranaldo, Shelley) – 3:50
"Silver Rocket" (Gordon, Moore, Ranaldo, Shelley) – 3:47
"Kissability" (Gordon, Moore, Ranaldo, Shelley) – 3:08

UK and US 7-inch flexi disc single 
"Teen Age Riot" (Gordon, Moore, Ranaldo, Shelley) – 6:39

Charts

References

Coley, Byron and Farell, Ray; Liner Notes, Daydream Nation, 'deluxe edition', copyright 2007 Geffen Records.

Songs about teenagers
Sonic Youth songs
1988 singles
1988 songs
Enigma Records singles